The Allies of World War II conducted an air attack upon a cruiser force at the major Japanese base of Rabaul in November 1943. In response to the Allied invasion of Bougainville, the Japanese had brought a strong cruiser force down from Truk, their major naval base in the Caroline Islands about 800 miles north of Rabaul, to Rabaul in preparation for a night engagement against the Allied supply and support shipping.  Allied carrier- and land-based planes attacked the Japanese ships, airfields, and port facilities on the island of New Britain to protect the Allied amphibious invasion of Bougainville. As a result of the Rabaul raids, the Japanese naval forces could no longer threaten the landings. The success of the raid began to change the strongly held belief that carrier-based air forces could not challenge land-based air forces.

Background
In early 1943, Rabaul had been distant from the fighting. However, the Allied grand strategy in the South West Pacific Area—Operation Cartwheel—aimed to isolate Rabaul and reduce it by air raids. Japanese ground forces were already retreating in New Guinea and in the Solomon Islands, abandoning Guadalcanal, Kolombangara, New Georgia and Vella Lavella.

Rabaul—on the island of New Britain—was one of two major ports in the Australian Territory of New Guinea. It was the main Japanese naval base for the Solomon Islands campaign and New Guinea campaign. Simpson Harbor—captured from Australian forces in February 1942—was known as "the Pearl Harbor of the South Pacific" and was well defended by 367 anti-aircraft guns and five airfields.

Lakunai and Vunakanau airfields were prewar Australian strips. Lakunai had an all-weather runway of sand and volcanic ash, and Vunakanau was surfaced with concrete. Rapopo— to the southeast—became operational in December 1942 with concrete runways and extensive support and maintenance facilities. Tobera—completed in August 1943 halfway between Vunakanau and Rapopo—also had concrete strips. The four dromes had 166 protected revetments for bombers and 265 for fighters, with additional unprotected dispersal parking areas. The fifth airfield protecting Rabaul was Borpop airfield, completed in December 1942 across the St. Georges Channel on New Ireland.

The anti-aircraft defenses were well coordinated by army and naval units. The army operated 192 of the 367 antiaircraft guns and the navy 175. The naval guns guarded Simpson Harbor and its shipping and the three airfields of Tobera, Lakunai, and Vunakanau. The army units defended Rapopo airfield, supply dumps and army installations; and assisted the navy in defending Simpson Harbor. An effective early warning radar system provided  coverage from Rabaul, and extended coverage with additional radars on New Britain, New Ireland, and at Buka. These sets provided from 30 to 60 minutes' early warning of an attack.

Land-based air campaign
As a part of Operation Cartwheel, in the fall of 1943 the U.S. Fifth Air Force, the Royal Australian Air Force and the Royal New Zealand Air Force, all under the command of General George Kenney, began a sustained bombing campaign against the airfields and port of Rabaul. The initial mission was delivered by 349 aircraft on 12 October 1943, but it could not be followed up immediately due to bad weather. A single raid by 50 B-25 Mitchell medium bombers reached the target on 18 October. Sustained attacks resumed on 23 October, culminating in a large raid on 2 November.

In the 2 November mission, nine squadrons of B-25s, 72 bombers in total, and six squadrons of P-38 Lightning totaling 80 fighter escorts attacked Simpson Harbor and its anti-aircraft defenses with  bombing attacks and minimum altitude strafing runs. Eight B-25s were shot down by AAA or Japanese naval fighters. Nine of the P-38s were also lost. Among the lost was Major Raymond H. Wilkins of the 3rd Attack Group, who was posthumously awarded the Medal of Honor.

Carrier attacks
The Navy had not contemplated an air attack upon Rabaul. Admiral William Halsey was implementing the next phase of his advance up the Solomon chain, and looked to establish a base on Bougainville.  On Bougainville the Japanese had two airfields at the southern tip of the island, one at the northernmost peninsula, and a fourth on Buka just across the northern passage. Instead of attempting a costly assault on these heavily defended areas Halsey landed his invasion force of 14,000 Marines at Empress Augusta Bay, about halfway up the west coast of Bougainville. There he would have his Seabees clear and build an airfield of their own.

On the first night the screening naval unit succeeded in defending the landing (the Battle of Empress Augusta Bay), but Admiral Mineichi Koga responded quickly.  Within a few days the local cruiser force had been augmented with reinforcements from Truk. The Japanese had been conserving their naval forces over the past year, but in the face of the imminent threat to Rabaul now committed substantial resources in hopes of crushing the newly landed force and its naval support. The force refueled at Rabaul in preparation for the coming battle.

Halsey lacked comparable surface forces to oppose this fresh challenge. His main surface strength, two battleships and a number of cruisers, had been transferred to the Central Pacific to support the upcoming invasion of Tarawa. These would have been considered a potent force for a battle at sea, but Rabaul was a heavily fortified port with five airfields and extensive anti-aircraft batteries. Navy aviators had termed it "a hornet's nest". With the exception of the surprise raid at Pearl Harbor, no attack against such a formidable land target had been attempted by carrier aircraft. As such it was considered a highly dangerous mission for the aircrews and placed the carriers themselves at risk. Halsey later said the threat that the Japanese cruiser force at Rabaul posed to his landings at Bougainville was "the most desperate emergency that confronted me in my entire term as ComSoPac."

With the fate of the landing in the balance, Halsey ordered his carriers, under command of Rear-Admiral Frederick Sherman, to steam north through the night of 4–5 November to get within range of Rabaul for a daybreak raid on the base. Approaching behind the cover of a weather front, Sherman launched all 97 of his available aircraft against the target, leaving no aircraft behind for combat air patrol over his ships. The aircrews were ordered to damage as many warships as possible, rather than attempting to achieve a sinking. Aircraft from airfields on Barakoma and the recently captured Vella Lavella were sent out to sea to rendezvous with the carrier force to provide it with some measure of protection.

The daybreak Navy air bombing of Rabaul was followed up an hour later with an Army Air Force raid by 27 B-24 Liberator heavy bombers of the Fifth Air Force, escorted by 58 P-38s. By the end of the attacks six of the seven Japanese cruisers at Rabaul had been damaged, four of them heavily.  suffered near misses by three  bombs that caused severe damage and killed 22 crewmen, including her captain.  was hit by one bomb above one of her engine rooms, causing heavy damage and killing 70 crewmen.  was hit by one 500 lb bomb and set afire, causing heavy damage and killing 19 crewmen.  was hit by two 500 lb bombs, causing heavy damage and killing 23 crewmen.  was slightly damaged by several near-misses. One bomb struck near , which damaged an anti-aircraft gun and killed one crewman. Three destroyers were also lightly damaged.

The strike had been a stunning success, effectively neutralizing Koga's cruisers as a threat to the Bougainville mission. Under the threat of additional airstrikes most of the Japanese warships departed for Truk the next day, practically ending Japanese naval presence in the area. Losses among the attacking aircraft were light.

Two days later an additional carrier unit, Task Group 50.3 (TG 50.3) of the U.S. 5th Fleet, reached Halsey, arriving on 7 November. These ships were among the first wave of newly built U.S. Navy warships and had only recently become operational. Halsey used Montgomery's ships as well as TF 38 in a combined strike against Rabaul on 11 November. Sherman launched his strike from near Green Island, northwest of Bougainville, which attacked in bad weather at about 08:30. After its return, TF 38 retired to the south without being detected.

Agano—which had remained at Rabaul after the 5 November strike—was torpedoed and heavily damaged in these attacks. The destroyer  reportedly suffered a direct bomb hit while loading torpedoes near the mouth of Rabaul Harbor. She blew up and sank, killing 148 of her crew. In the wake of the raids the Japanese launched a series of counterattacks involving 120 aircraft against the U.S. carriers, but the force was intercepted and lost 35 planes without inflicting damage on Montgomery's ships. Not only had these raids succeeded in protecting the allies' recent gains, but they left Rabaul itself as an increasingly isolated outpost, difficult to supply and posing little danger to accelerating allied operations in the region. The capture of Bougainville and Buka brought Rabaul into range of land-based US Navy and Marine Corps tactical bombers for the first time, setting the stage for the pacification campaign intended to neutralize Rabaul that began on 17 December 1943.

See also
 Neutralisation of Rabaul

Notes

References

- neutral review of this book here:

External links

 Account of U.S. Marine involvement in air war over Solomon Islands and Rabaul.

- Tabular records of movement for the Japanese warships involved in this battle.

Conflicts in 1943
1943 in Papua New Guinea
South West Pacific theatre of World War II
United States Marine Corps in World War II
World War II aerial operations and battles of the Pacific theatre
Huon
Battles and operations of World War II involving Papua New Guinea
Battles of World War II involving Australia
Battles of World War II involving Japan
Battles and operations of World War II involving New Zealand
Naval aviation operations and battles
November 1943 events